Bruck am Ziller is a municipality in the Schwaz district in the Austrian state of Tyrol. The name derives from the river Ziller.

Geography
Bruck lies at the entrance to the Ziller valley east of the river on a low terrace.

References

Cities and towns in Schwaz District